Ptilophora may refer to:
 Microseris (syn. Ptilophora), a genus of plants in the sunflower family
 Ptilophora (alga), a genus of red alga in the family Gelidiaceae
 Ptilophora (moth), a genus of moth in the family Notodontidae